Haken are an English progressive metal band formed in 2007 by multi-instrumentalist Richard Henshall, guitarist Matthew Marshall, and vocalist Ross Jennings. While Henshall, Marshall, and Jennings first had the idea of forming Haken in 2004, they opted to pursue their instruments and songwriting first. Upon recruiting other members three years later, they eventually released the demo Enter the 5th Dimension in 2008, signing with Sensory Records and releasing their first album Aquarius in 2010. , they have released seven studio albums, two EPs, and two live albums.

History

Early years
Richard Henshall, Matthew Marshall, and Ross Jennings had grown up as friends in their teenage years and first had the idea to form Haken in 2004, when they would regularly play together in "casual bedroom jams". Henshall mentioned on some occasions that "Haken" was the name of a fictional character he and some friends came up with in their school days, under the influence of alcohol or weed. At the time the three considered the jams as a hobby, but they eventually chose to focus on studying their instruments and rejoined three years later to form the band. Early on, Jennings ended up parting ways with Henshall and Marshall as their guitar skills far eclipsed his own. He would later be asked to re-join as solely a vocalist. They completed their lineup with a keyboardist they met on an online forum, Pete Jones, as well as Jones' close friend Raymond Hearne. To-Mera guitarist Thomas MacLean became the band's bassist.

Haken recorded a demo in 2007, followed by a full-length demo titled Enter the 5th Dimension in 2008. Later that year, Marshall and Jones left the band to pursue other careers.

Charlie Griffiths, the guitarist for the band Linear Sphere and Anchorhead, became a full-time member of the band. Griffiths parted ways with Linear Sphere because he wanted to go in a different direction musically. Keyboardist Diego Tejeida auditioned and eventually joined the band in late 2008 as well.

Aquarius, Visions, and The Mountain
Ken Golden of Sensory Records offered them a record deal after a referral. They began recording for their debut album, Aquarius, soon after and released it in March 2010. Haken released their second album, Visions, in October 2011.

Haken announced their third album, The Mountain, on 20 June 2013. The album, released on 2 September by Inside Out Music, was mixed and mastered by Jens Bogren. On 25 September, Haken announced that MacLean would be leaving the band after completing the Prog Stage Festival in Israel in October 2013. After a series of auditions, his position was filled by Conner Green.

Restoration EP and Affinity

Haken then released Restoration on 27 October 2014. This EP contained three reworked tracks from Enter the 5th Dimension. "Darkest Light", a reworked version of "Blind", was released with a music video featuring footage from the recording process of Restoration on 24 September. Shortly before, the band announced on Facebook that they had begun writing their fourth album.

On 9 February 2016, a press release along with a micro site called "Haken OS 4.0.1" was released with information of Affinity. To promote the album, a long series of teasers had been posted by the band, jokingly referring to the new album as Verbatim. The official music video for the lead single, "Initiate", was released online on 18 March 2016. It was released on Inside Out Music on 29 April 2016. Affinity is seen as the first release where all members of the band contributed towards its songwriting. During this period, Jennings formed the side project Novena which released the EP Secondary Genesis in 2016.

Haken band began to tour with former Dream Theater drummer Mike Portnoy and Neal Morse Band guitarist Eric Gillette in 2017, performing the Twelve-step Suite in its entirety (among other Dream Theater songs), the outfit named Mike Portnoy's Shattered Fortress. They also reissued their first two albums that year.

Vector and Virus
On 13 April 2018, the band announced the release of their first ever live album, titled L-1VE. It was recorded and filmed on 13 April 2017, at the Melkweg venue in Amsterdam during their tenth anniversary tour. The live audio was mixed by Neal Morse and The Winery Dogs alumnus Jerry Guidroz. The album was released on 22 June 2018.

Haken also revealed that they started work on their fifth studio album:

Vector was then released on 26 October 2018 with positive reviews. The second album by Jennings's side project Novena, Eleventh Hour, was released on 6 March 2020. In August 2019, Henshall released a solo album titled The Cocoon, featuring Jennings on vocals in one song. After some delays, Haken's sixth studio album Virus (which is linked to Vector) was released on 24 July 2020.

On 26 August 2020, A Japanese-exclusive version of Virus was released, including, as a bonus track, an acoustic version of the song "Canary Yellow" featuring Bent Knee vocalist Courtney Swain who provides backing and chorus vocals. Jennings announced his own upcoming solo album that same month.

Departure of Diego Tejeida and Fauna
On 22 November 2021, the band announced that keyboardist Diego Tejeida had parted ways with them due to both parties having "very different musical visions".

On 31 December 2021, Jennings announced on Instagram page that a seventh Haken album was in the works, along with his second solo album. Founding member Peter Jones was announced to return to the band in 2022.

On 26 April 2022, the band released their single "Nightingale". On 30 August 2022, the band announced 'The Island in Limbo Tour', a co-headlining European tour with Between the Buried and Me, scheduled to start in February 2023.

On 24 November 2022, the band launched a game whose prize was an excerpt from a piece called 'The Alphabet of Me' on their upcoming album Fauna (due out on March 3, 2023) and its cover art.

Writing process
Haken is known to occasionally release short videos of rehearsals and writing sessions on the members respective public social media accounts. The following was asked to the members during a Reddit "Ask Us Anything" in May 2014:

To which Richard Henshall replied;

Publicity and reception
Haken has been featured on the Classic Rock Magazine subsidiary "Classic Rock Presents Prog" a few times. At first, the magazine presented a song from the first Haken demo on their free CD. They have opened for a few notable progressive outfits, such as King's X and Bigelf. The band's debut album has received positive reviews from Allmusic and Classic Rock Magazine. Additionally, the band hosted an "ask me anything" on Reddit in 2014.

Band members

Current members
 Ross Jennings – lead vocals (2007–present)
 Richard Henshall – guitars, keyboards, backing vocals (2007–present)
 Raymond Hearne – drums, backing vocals, tuba (2007–present)
 Charles Griffiths – guitars, backing vocals (2008–present)
 Conner Green – bass, backing vocals (2014–present)
 Peter Jones – keyboards, backing vocals (2007–2008, 2022–present)

Former members
 Matthew Marshall – guitars (2007–2008)
 Thomas MacLean – bass, backing vocals (2007–2013)
 Diego Tejeida – keyboards, backing vocals (2008–2021)

Live members
 Pete Rinaldi – bass, backing vocals (2014)

Timeline

Discography

Studio albums 
 Aquarius (2010)
 Visions (2011)
 The Mountain (2013)
 Affinity (2016)
 Vector (2018)
 Virus (2020)
 Fauna (2023)

Live albums 
 L-1VE (2018)

EPs 
 Restoration (2014)
 L+1VE (2018)

Demos 
 Enter the 5th Dimension (2008)

References

External links
Official website
[ Allmusic Guide page]
2011 interview with Haken on Prog Sphere
An interview with Richard Henshall and Ross Jennings on Prog Sphere

English progressive metal musical groups
English progressive rock groups
Musical groups from London
2007 establishments in England
Musical groups established in 2007
Inside Out Music artists